The 1959–60 Polska Liga Hokejowa season was the 25th season of the Polska Liga Hokejowa, the top level of ice hockey in Poland. Eight teams participated in the league, and Gornik Katowice won the championship.

Regular season

External links
 Season on hockeyarchives.info

Polska
Polska Hokej Liga seasons
1959–60 in Polish ice hockey